The 2012 Texas Southern Tigers football team represented Texas Southern University in the 2012 NCAA Division I FCS football season. The Tigers were led by first-year head coach Darrell Asberry  and played their home games at a new stadium, BBVA Compass Stadium. They were a member of the West Division of the Southwestern Athletic Conference (SWAC) and finished the season with an overall record of two wins and nine losses (2–9, 2–7 SWAC).

Media
Texas Southern football games were carried live on KTSU 90.9 FM.

Before the season

2012 recruits
14 players signed up to join the 2012 Texas Southern team.

Postseason suspension
Texas Southern was barred from postseason football play for the 2012 season due to falling short in fulfilling the NCAA graduation rate requirements.

Roster

Schedule

Game summaries

Prairie View A&M

Sources:

Texas Southern holds an 18-8 advantage in the Labor Day Classic, but Prairie View A&M had won the most recent 5 games headed into this game.

North Texas

Sources:

North Texas and Texas Southern met for the first time in the schools' histories.

Jackson State

Sources:

Alabama A&M

Sources:

Sam Houston State

The Tigers and Bearkats play each other for the first time since 1997. The Bearkats look to build on an 8-5 record they have against the Tigers. The Bearkats won the most recent meeting in 1997 and have won 4 of the last 5 and 8 of the last 10.

Sources:

Alabama State

Sources:

Southern

Sources:

Grambling State

Sources:

Arkansas–Pine Bluff

Sources:

Alcorn State

Sources:

Mississippi Valley State

Sources:

References

Texas Southern
Texas Southern Tigers football seasons
Texas Southern Tigers football